St Patrick's GAA Club Wicklow Town is a Gaelic Athletic Association club with teams competing in Hurling, Gaelic Football, and Ladies Football in Wicklow League and Championship competitions.

St Patrick's GAA club is the only GAA club in Wicklow Town and has three men's football teams, Senior, Junior A and Junior C. They have nine juvenile football teams. They also have a senior hurling team and 3 juvenile hurling teams.

The ladies section comprises a senior team, an intermediate team and 5 Juvenile football teams including 2012 County Champions at Under 16, Under 14 and Under 12.

It is one of the largest and most successful clubs in County Wicklow and won the Wicklow Senior Football Championship in 2004, 2006, 2012, 2018, 2019 and 2022.

Achievements
 Wicklow Senior Football Championships: (15)
 1950, 1952, 1953, 1955, 1956, 1959, 1960, 1961, 1969, 2004, 2006, 2012, 2018, 2019, 2022
 Wicklow Senior Hurling Championships: (6)
 1903, 1926, 1928, 1930, 1991, 1993

References

1. wicklowgaaonline 2012 County Final Result

2. wicklowgaaonline 2012 Ladies Intermediate County Final Result

External links
Official website

Gaelic games clubs in County Wicklow
Gaelic football clubs in County Wicklow
Hurling clubs in County Wicklow
Wicklow (town)